Gorokhovetsky District is an administrative and municipal district (raion), one of the sixteen in Vladimir Oblast, Russia. It is located in the east of the oblast. Its administrative center is the town of Gorokhovets. Population:   25,832 (2002 Census);  The population of Gorokhovets accounts for 60.7% of the district's total population.

References

Notes

Sources

Districts of Vladimir Oblast